Matacoan (also Mataguayan, Matákoan, Mataguayo, Mataco–Mataguayo, Matacoano, Matacoana) is a language family of northern Argentina, western Paraguay, and southeastern Bolivia.

Family division
Matacoan consists of four clusters of languages. The family also has a clear binary split between Wichí-Chorote and Maká-Nivaclé according to Nikulin (2019). Gordon (2005) in Ethnologue divides Wichí into three separate languages and Chorote into two languages.

Matacoan
 Wichí-Chorote
 Wichí (also known as Mataco, Wichi, Wichí Lhamtés, Weenhayek, Noctenes, Matahuayo, Matako, Weʃwo. The name Mataco is common but pejorative.)
Vejoz (also known as Vejo, Pilcomayo, Bermejo, Wichí Lhamtés Vejoz)
Noktén (also known as Noctén, Wichí Lhamtés Nocten)
Wiznay (also known as Güisnay, Wichí Lhamtés Güisnay)
Matawayo (also known as Matahuayo).
 Chorote (also known as Chorotí, Yofúaha, Tsoloti)
Manhui (also known as Manjuy, Iyo’wujwa Chorote)
Eklenhui (also known as Eclenjuy, Eklehui, Iyojwa’ja Chorote, Chorote, Choroti).
 Maká-Nivaclé
 Nivaclé (also known as Chulupí–Ashlushlay, Chulupí, Ajlujlay, Alhulhai, Niwaklé, Niwaqli, Churupi, Chulupe. The name Chulupí is common but pejorative.)
Forest Nivaclé
River Nivaclé
 Maká (also known as Macá, Maca, Towolhi, Toothle, Nynaka, Mak’á, Enimaca, Enimaga)
Ma’ká (also known as Towolhi)
Enimaga (also known as Enimaa, Kochaboth)

Mason (1950)
Internal classification by Mason (1950):

Mataco-Maca
Mataco
Mataco-Mataguayo
Mataco
Guisnay
Nocten (Octenai)
Mataguayo
Northern: Hueshuo, Pesatupe, Abucheta
Southern: Vejoz
Chorotí-Ashluslay
Chorotí (Yofuaha)
Ashluslay (Chulupí, Chonopí, Sukin, Sotiagay, Tapieté)
Macá (Enimagá, Cochaboth, Guaná, Lengua)
Enimagá
Macá (Towothli, Toosle)
Guentusé
Cochaboth-Lengua

Vocabulary
Loukotka (1968) lists the following basic vocabulary items for the Matacoan languages.

Proto-language
For a reconstruction of Proto-Mataguayo by Viegas Barros (2002), see the corresponding Spanish article.

References

Bibliography
 Adelaar, Willem F. H.; & Muysken, Pieter C. (2004). The languages of the Andes. Cambridge language surveys. Cambridge University Press.
 Campbell, Lyle. (1997). American Indian languages: The historical linguistics of Native America. New York: Oxford University Press. .
 Fabre, Alain (2005) Los Mataguayo (Online version: http://www.ling.fi/Entradas%20diccionario/Dic=Mataguayo.pdf)

External links

 Proel: Familia matákoan

 
Mataco–Guaicuru languages
Language families
Chaco linguistic area